Foreign Body is a 1986 British romantic comedy film directed by Ronald Neame and adapted from the 1975 Roderick Mann novel of the same name. The film stars Victor Banerjee, Warren Mitchell, Denis Quilley, and Amanda Donohoe. It was Neame's final film.

Plot
Banerjee stars as Ram Das, a jobless Indian man who, tired of life in mid-1970s Calcutta, steals money from his father in order to afford a passage to Britain and while there, falls in love with a white woman.

Cast
Victor Banerjee as Ram Das
Geraldine McEwan as Lady Ammanford
Warren Mitchell as I.Q. Patel
Denis Quilley as Prime Minister
Amanda Donohoe as Susan Partridge
Eve Ferret as Norah
Anna Massey as Miss Furze
Stratford Johns as Mr. Plumb
Trevor Howard as Dr. Stirry
Jane Laurie as Jo Masters (as Janet Laurie)
Rashid Karapiet as Mr. Nahan
Sinitta Renay as Indian girl
Marc Zuber as Macho escort
Janet Henfrey as Landlady
Ann Firbank as Mrs. Plumb
Richard Wilson as Colonel Partridge
Timothy Bateson as Agent at Harley Street

Reception
Walter Goodman of The New York Times didn't give the film a good review stating:

References

External links

1986 films
1986 romantic comedy films
British romantic comedy films
Films set in India
Orion Pictures films
Films directed by Ronald Neame
1980s English-language films
1980s British films